Melisa Murillo Rivas (born 13 January 1982, in El Cerrito, Valle del Cauca) is a retired Colombian athlete who specialised in the sprinting events. She represented her country at the 2004 Summer Olympics. She was also the reserve relay member at the 2000 Summer Olympics but was not selected to run.

Competition record

Personal bests
Outdoor
100 metres – 11.22 (+1.6 m/s) (Armenia 2005)
200 metres – 24.94 (-0.9 m/s) (Bydgoszcz 1999)

Indoor
60 metres – 7.43 (Boston 2004)

References

1982 births
Living people
Colombian female sprinters
Athletes (track and field) at the 2000 Summer Olympics
Athletes (track and field) at the 2004 Summer Olympics
Olympic athletes of Colombia
Athletes (track and field) at the 2003 Pan American Games
Pan American Games competitors for Colombia
Sportspeople from Valle del Cauca Department
Central American and Caribbean Games gold medalists for Colombia
Competitors at the 2002 Central American and Caribbean Games
Central American and Caribbean Games medalists in athletics
Olympic female sprinters
21st-century Colombian women